Deir Ghazaleh is a Palestinian village in the northern West Bank,  located nine kilometers northeast of Jenin in the Jenin Governorate. According to the Palestinian Central Bureau of Statistics, Deir Ghazaleh had a population of over 850 inhabitants in mid-year 2006, mostly Muslims with a small Christian minority.

History
Ceramics from the Byzantine era have been found here.

Ottoman era

Deir Ghazaleh was incorporated into the Ottoman Empire in 1517 with all of  Palestine, and by the 1596 tax register it was  part of nahiya (subdistrict) of  Jinin under the liwa' (district) of Lajjun, with a population of 5 Muslim households. The villagers paid a fixed tax rate of 25% on agricultural products,  including  wheat, barley, summer crops, olive trees, beehives and/or goats, in addition to occasional revenues; a total of  3,000 akçe.

In 1838, Edward Robinson noted  Deir Ghuzal as one of a range of villages round a height, the other villages being named as Beit Qad, Fuku'a, Deir Abu Da'if and Araneh,  located in the District of Jenin, also called Haritheh esh-Shemaliyeh.

In 1870  Victor Guérin found it have about fifteen  houses, bordered by several antiquated cisterns and  silos.

In 1882 the  PEF's Survey of Western Palestine  found that it resembled Deir Abu Da'if, and that "the ground round it is partly rock, partly arable land."

They further noted a ruin, one mile to the south east of the village,  "It is firmly bedded into the earth, which contains fragments of pottery, apparently ancient. The stone seems to have been packed with smaller ones round its base to keep it in position, as found by excavation. The stones are very heavy, and the construction of this monument must have been a considerable labour. It somewhat resembles the vinevard towers existing in other parts of Palestine; but fallen stones sufficient for such a structure were not observed, and there is no reason to suppose it to have ever consisted of more than two courses."

British Mandate era
In the 1922 census of Palestine, conducted by the British Mandate authorities, the village had a population of 134; 120 Muslims and 14 Christians, where the Christians were all Orthodox,  increasing slightly in the 1931 census  to 186;  169 Muslims and 17 Christians, with 34 houses.

In  1944/5 statistics the population was 270; 240 Muslims and 30 Christians, with a total of 6,588  dunams of land, according to an official land and population survey. Of this, 160 dunams were used for  plantations and irrigable land, 4,917  dunams were for cereals, while 6 dunams were built-up (urban) land.

Jordanian era
After the 1948 Arab-Israeli War, Deir Ghazaleh came under  Jordanian rule.

In 1961, the population of  Deir Ghazzala was  493, of whom 29 were Christian.

Post-1967
Deir Ghazaleh has been  under  Israeli occupation along with the rest of the West Bank since the 1967 Six-Day War, and according to the Israeli census of that year, the population of Deir Ghazzala stood at 494, of whom 163 were registered as having come  from Israel.

Water sources
The main source of water is the large groundwater aquifer underlying the West Bank. A well on the outskirts of the village, called the Abu ´Ahed well, supplies water to the village and surrounding communities.

Education and culture
A library was established in Deir Ghazaleh under the auspices of the Program for the Social Empowerment of Rural Women. The Deir Ghazaleh Women’s club, established in 1997, offers training course and workshops for local women.

References

Bibliography

External links 
 Welcome To Dayr Ghazzala
Deir Ghazala, Welcome to Palestine
Survey of Western Palestine, Map 9: IAA,  Wikimedia commons  

Jenin Governorate
Villages in the West Bank